The Ven.  James Strange Butson (10 February 1778 – 29 January 1845) was an Irish Anglican priest.

Butson was the son of Bishop Christopher Butson. He was educated at Winchester College and New College, Oxford.  He was the  Prebendary of Kilconnell in Clonfert Cathedral from 1809 until 1812;  and Archdeacon of Clonfert from 1812 until his death.

His son was himself Archdeacon of Clonfert, then Dean of Kilmacduagh.

Notes

Alumni of New College, Oxford
Archdeacons of Clonfert
1845 deaths
1778 births
People educated at Winchester College